Idrissa Traoré Essien (born 6 May 1991) is a Malian international footballer who plays for Al-Nahda, as a midfielder.

Club career
Born in Bamako, Traoré has played for Requins de l'Atlantique, Real Bamako, Djoliba, Stade Gabèsien, Stade Malien, Vita Club, Darnes and Shabaab al Jabal.

On 14 August 2019 Omani club Sohar SC confirmed, that they had signed Traoré.

International career
He made his international debut for Mali in 2015.

References

1991 births
Living people
Malian footballers
Mali international footballers
Requins de l'Atlantique FC players
AS Real Bamako players
Djoliba AC players
Stade Gabèsien players
Stade Malien players
AS Vita Club players
Darnes SC players
Shabaab al Jabal players
Sohar SC players
Zakho FC players
Al-Nahda Club (Saudi Arabia) players
Sportspeople from Bamako
Association football midfielders
Malian expatriate footballers
Malian expatriate sportspeople in Benin
Expatriate footballers in Benin
Malian expatriate sportspeople in Tunisia
Expatriate footballers in Tunisia
Malian expatriate sportspeople in the Democratic Republic of the Congo
Expatriate footballers in the Democratic Republic of the Congo
Malian expatriate sportspeople in Libya
Expatriate footballers in Libya
Malian expatriate sportspeople in Oman
Expatriate footballers in Oman
Malian expatriate sportspeople in Iraq
Expatriate footballers in Iraq
Malian expatriate sportspeople in Saudi Arabia
Expatriate footballers in Saudi Arabia
Libyan Premier League players
Iraqi Premier League players
Saudi Second Division players
21st-century Malian people
Mali A' international footballers
2011 African Nations Championship players